Tumut is a town in the Riverina region of New South Wales, Australia, situated on the banks of the Tumut River.

Tumut sits on the north-west foothills of the Snowy Mountains and is located on the traditional lands of the Wiradjuri, Wolgalu and Ngunnawal Aboriginal peoples.

Tumut is often referred to as the 'gateway to the snowy' Snowy Mountains Scheme. The former Tumut Shire was administered from offices located in the town.

Tumut is home to a number of historic buildings, including an Anglican church designed by Edmund Blacket and a Courthouse designed by James Barnet. Many of the pubs in the town have been in use from the mid to late 1800s.

Early settlers established many European deciduous trees throughout the area. The stand of Poplars, Elm and Willow, amongst others, create a well renowned display of colour over autumn. Tumut celebrates this with the yearly Festival of the Falling Leaf.

Etymology

The word Tumut is derived from a possibly Wiradjuri indigenous word for the area, possibly doo-maaht or doormat, meaning "a quiet resting place by the river".

History

The area's rivers may have been the boundaries or connection-points of the three traditional owners linked to this 'country'.  During summertime, the high country was a meeting place for tribes, with Bogong moths being an abundant food source in the warmer months.

British pastoralists began acquiring land in the area during the 1830s. In 1845, a Court of Petty Sessions was established at Tumut with Frederick Walker appointed as the inaugural magistrate. Walker later became famous as the first commandant of the Native Police force based mostly in Queensland.

Tumut Post Office opened 1 January 1849. A public hospital opened in the town in 1900. After many years of lobbying by the local community, construction of the railway line from Gundagai began in 1901, reaching Tumut by 1903 with the first train arriving on 2 December that year. A further extension was built to Batlow and Kunama from a junction at Gilmore, a few kilometres southwest of Tumut. Train services were progressively reduced in the early 1980s before the final trains to Cootamundra ran in January 1984 before being suspended when flood damage to the line was deemed not economical to repair.

Tumut was one of the ten areas short-listed in 1908 as a site for the Australian Capital Territory. Other locations that were short-listed include Albury, Armidale, Bombala, Dalgety, Lake George, Orange, Tooma, Lyndhurst and Yass-Canberra. 

The site of the new capital city would not have been the existing town of Tumut. It seems two sites near Tumut for a new city were proposed; one to the east of Tumut, at a site in the valley of Goobarragandra River, which is now part of the localities of Little River and Lacmalac; and another site between Tumut and Adelong, near Gadara, under which Tumut itself would have become a part of the new Federal Territory. Planning work occurred for both sites. 

An earlier vote following inspections of potential sites in 1902 saw the new Federal House of Representatives vote in favour of Tumut as the location for the capital, however the Senate favoured Bombala so no consensus was reached. When federal parliamentarians put the final decision to a series of nine elimination ballots, in October 1908, Tumut was eliminated in the fifth ballot.

The town's rugby league team competed in the Riverina Maher Cup competition, beginning as a fixture between teams from Gundagai and Tumut under rugby union rules in 1920, before switching to league rules in 1921.

Climate

Tumut's climate is considerably wetter than other regions in the lower plains of the South West Slopes, owing to its location at the immediate foot of the Brindabella Range; hot, dry summers and cool, wet winters characterise its climate. Cold rain below  and sleet are a usual occurrence in winter. Under the Köppen climate classification scheme, the town is located in transitional areas between the humid subtropical (Cfa) and oceanic climates (Cfb).

Rainfall records began in 1883 at Adelong (Tumut St), but temperature averages not until 1907, and temperature extremes not until 1965. All records ceased in 1994.

Heritage listings
Tumut has a number of heritage-listed sites, including:
 Adelong Falls Gold Workings
 Cootamundra-Tumut railway: Tumut railway station
 46 Russell Street: Montreal Community Theatre
 Tumut Plains Road: Junction Bridge, Tumut
 82-84 Wynyard Street: Tumut Post Office

Economy 

Tumut is the centre of a softwood industry based on plantation Pinus radiata. CarterHoltHarvey Woodproducts (Central and Northern Regions) Pty Ltd operate a major sawmill on Adelong Road (the Snowy Mountains Highway) and a chipboard panel factory next door. 8 km further west on the Snowy Mountains Highway at Gilmore the company also operates a sawlog processing plant.

The Visy Industries pulp and paper mill is located north of the Snowy Mountains Highway at Gadara (between Tumut and Adelong). The Visy mill is the only paper mill owned by Visy that makes paper from wood (their other mills all use recycled paper as the raw material), and is one of the biggest wood mills in Australia.

Transport
Tumut is situated on the Snowy Mountains Highway, but is connected by secondary roads to Gundagai as well as alternative routes to Canberra across the Brindabella Range via Brindabella Road and Wee Jasper Road. Despite being more direct, the terrain and road conditions limit traffic via these routes. This has led to calls by the council and local businesses for funding to upgrade the Brindabella Road, as the increased traffic would provide the town greater economic opportunities.

The town was served by a railway branch line from Cootamundra, which operated from 1903 until 1984, when services were suspended due to flooding. Although the line is not formally closed, it is unlikely to see service again with sections of track lifted during upgrades to the Hume Highway near Gundagai.

Coach services operate three times each week to Tumbarumba in the south, connecting with rail services to Melbourne and Sydney at Cootamundra three times each week.

Tumut Shire operates Tumut Airport, a small facility located a few kilometres out of town catering to general aviation. Currently there are no scheduled services to the airport.

Sport
The Tumut Blues compete in the Group 9 Rugby League competition, winning premierships in 1949, 1973, 2003, 2007, 2008, 2010 and 2019.

Notable people
Ray Beavanrugby league player
Allan Butlerparalympian
Kim Carr (born 1955)is an Australian politician, a Senator for Victoria and former Minister of several departments
Reg DowningAttorney General of New South Wales (1956–65)
Cate Fowler AMtheatre producer, dramaturg
David Johnsonformer CEO of Campbell Soup Company
Tom Kirkrugby league player
Tony McRaeMember and Minister in Western Australian Parliament (2001–08)
Tony Quirkrugby league player
John RyanVictoria Cross recipient
Sally Shipardformer international soccer player
Rosie Waterlandauthor

See also
Tumut High School

References

External links

 Tumut Shire Council

 
Towns in New South Wales
Snowy Mountains Highway
Snowy Valleys Council
Proposed sites for national capital of Australia